Sipiada is a former municipality in Magnesia, Thessaly, Greece. Since the 2011 local government reform it is part of the municipality South Pelion, of which it is a municipal unit. The municipal unit has an area of 122.404 km2. Population 2,047 (2011). The seat of the municipality was in Lafkos.

References

Pelion